The 2015–16 MSV Duisburg season was the 116th season in the club's football history. In 2015–16 the club played in the 2. Bundesliga, the second tier of German football after being promoted.

The preseason started on 15 June 2015.

Players

Team

Transfers

In

Out

Preseason and friendlies

Results

2. Bundesliga

League table

Results summary

Result round by round

Matches

Relegation play-offs

DFB-Pokal

Statistics

Squad statistics

|}

Goals

Disciplinary record

References

External links

German football clubs 2015–16 season
MSV Duisburg seasons